Belfast Food is a music band from Rijeka, Croatia, performing Irish folk and rock music under their current name since 1996. 

They have been featured on the national charts at least once.

Belfast Food had several original hit singles, such as "Van iz grada", "Trivijalna stvar", "Lagano lagano". They have also created covers of popular Irish songs, such as "Rocky Road to Dublin" ,"Dirty Old Town" ("Šporki stari grad") or the Australian "Waltzing Matilda" ("Mate i Matilda").

Discography

Studio albums
 Live in Rijeka (Kondorcomm, 1997)
 Zašto zato (Kondorcomm, 2000)
 Melodije Irske i Kvarnera (Dallas Records, 2002)
 Zeleni album (Dallas Records, 2006)
 Live in Tvornica (Audio CD and Video DVD, Dallas Records, 2008)

Singles

References

Croatian musical groups
Musical groups established in 1996
1996 establishments in Croatia